Saul Hersh Rubinek (born July 2, 1948) is a German-born Canadian actor, director, producer, and playwright. 

He is widely known for his television roles, notably Artie Nielsen on Warehouse 13, Donny Douglas on Frasier, Lon Cohen on A Nero Wolfe Mystery, and Louis B. Mayer on The Last Tycoon. He also starred in the films Against All Odds (1984), Wall Street (1987), The Bonfire of the Vanities (1990), Unforgiven (1992), Nixon (1995), True Romance (1993), The Express (2008), Barney's Version (2010), and The Ballad of Buster Scruggs (2018). 

Rubinek is a five-time Genie Award nominee, winning Best Supporting Actor for Ticket to Heaven (1981), and a two-time Gemini Award nominee. His directorial film debut, Jerry and Tom (1998), was nominated for the Grand Jury Prize at the 1998 Sundance Film Festival. He was previously a stage actor and director, working with the Stratford Shakespeare Festival and Theatre Passe Muraille, and co-founding the Canadian Stage Company.

Early life
Rubinek was born in Föhrenwald, a displaced-persons camp in Allied-occupied Germany, in 1948. His parents, Frania and Israel Rubinek, were both Yiddish-speaking Polish Jews who were hidden by Polish farmers for over two years during World War II. The family emigrated to Canada the same year Rubinek was born. He attended Camp B'nai Brith in Sainte-Agathe-des-Monts, Quebec.

Rubinek wrote the book So Many Miracles (Penguin Canada) on his parents' experiences in the war.

Career
At the encouragement of his parents, Rubinek began taking acting lessons and joined the Ottawa Little Theatre. In 1969, he began performing at the Stratford Festival. He contributed to the Toronto theatre scene, co-founding the Canadian Stage Company and working with Theatre Passe Muraille as an actor and producer. He began working in the United States in the 1970s, acting in Off-Broadway productions. In 1984, he won a Drama-Logue Award for Des McAnuff's La Jolla production of As You Like It.

Early in his career, Rubinek gained the attention of Canadian audiences when he starred as detective Benny Cooperman in two TV films, The Suicide Murders (1985) and Murder Sees the Light (1986), which are based on books in author Howard Engel's series of mystery novels set in the Niagara Region of Canada. Rubinek starred as Owen Hughes, the antagonist, in Obsessed (1987). In another TV film, Liberace: Behind the Music (1988), he played Seymour Heller, the long-time friend and manager of Liberace.

In 1982, he played Allan in the sex-themed romantic comedy Soup for One, directed and written by Jonathan Kaufer and produced by Marvin Worth. Rubinek appeared in Taylor Hackford's Against All Odds (1984), Alan Alda's Sweet Liberty as director Bo Hodges, Oliver Stone's Wall Street (1987), as a lawyer, The Outside Chance of Maximilian Glick (1988), as a fun-loving rabbi, Brian De Palma's The Bonfire of the Vanities (1990), again as a lawyer, and in a lead part as a rabbi in The Quarrel (1991). He is noted for his performance in Clint Eastwood's Unforgiven (1992) as a pulp fiction writer. He had a notable role in Tony Scott's True Romance (1993) as Lee Donowitz, a pompous, cocaine-addicted film producer based on Joel Silver.

He co-starred in the 1993 Emmy Award-winning American made-for-television docudrama And the Band Played On as Dr. Jim Curran. Rubinek played the character Kivas Fajo in the Star Trek: The Next Generation episode "The Most Toys." Rubinek, an ardent Star Trek fan, abruptly took over the part after David Rappaport, the actor who was originally cast in the role, attempted suicide shortly after the filming of the episode had begun. (Rappaport later died by suicide just before the episode premiered.)  Photographs of Rubinek in character were used on two cards in Decipher's 1994 ST:TNG card game: a character card entitled "Kivas Fajo" and an event card entitled "Kivas Fajo: Collector."  In 1998, "The Fajo Collection," a limited (40,000 copies) edition set of 18 new cards, was released as an addition to this card game.

Another science fiction role portrayed by Rubinek was as a documentary film director named Emmett Bregman, on the seventh season of the Canadian-American military science fiction television series Stargate SG-1, in a two-part episode called "Heroes, Parts 1 & 2".

He played Donny Douglas (Daphne Moon's fiancé and Niles Crane's divorce lawyer) in several episodes of the American sitcom Frasier.

He appeared, in various roles, in two episodes of the 1995 revival of The Outer Limits. He played the role of Louis the Lion on YTV's The Adventures of Dudley the Dragon (1995). He had a cameo appearance as a casino pit boss in the film Rush Hour 2.

Rubinek played Alan Mintz opposite Nicolas Cage in the 2000 film The Family Man. In 2000, Rubinek played Detective Saul Panzer in The Golden Spiders: A Nero Wolfe Mystery, the series pilot for the 2001-02 A&E TV series A Nero Wolfe Mystery, in which he would subsequently play the recurring role of reporter Lon Cohen. In 2005 he appeared in the short-lived American television series Blind Justice, and has appeared from 2006 to 2012 in the supporting role of Hasty Hathaway in the Jesse Stone series of TV films, starring Tom Selleck.

His single-episode guest appearances during the 2000s include two 2004 episodes of Curb Your Enthusiasm as Dr. Saul Funkhouser, the "Adrift" episode in the beginning of Losts second season in 2005, the 2006 "Invincible" episode of Eureka, the 2007 episode of the TV series Masters of Horror "The Washingtonians", and a 2008 episode of the TV series Psych. That same year he guest-starred as Victor Dubenich, the antagonist in the pilot episode of Leverage, reappearing in 2012 for the last two episodes of season 4. In 2013, he guest-starred in two subsequent episodes of the TV series Person of Interest.

In 2005, he directed the independent film Cruel but Necessary. The following year he appeared in a supporting role in the 2009 Canadian feature comedy The Trotsky. Rubinek starred in the Syfy series Warehouse 13 as Artie Nielsen, a covert agent employed by a secretive council to recover mystical artifacts with his team. The series finale was aired on May 19, 2014, on Syfy.

His first play, Terrible Advice, premiered in September 2011 at the Menier Chocolate Factory Theatre in London, starring Scott Bakula, Sharon Horgan, Andy Nyman and Caroline Quentin. In 2018, he was cast as a series regular on the Amazon Prime series Hunters.

 Filmography 

 Film 

 Television 

 Accolades Academy of Canadian Cinema & Television 1980 Genie Award for Best Actor (Non-Feature): The Wordsmith (nominated)
 1980 Genie Award for Best Supporting Actor: The Agency (nominated)
 1982 Genie Award for Best Supporting Actor: Ticket to Heaven (won)
 1983 Genie Award for Best Supporting Actor: By Design (nominated)
 1989 Genie Award for Best Supporting Actor: The Outside Chance of Maximilian Glick (nominated)
 1998 Gemini Award for Best Performance by an Actor in a Featured Supporting Role in a Dramatic Program: Hiroshima (nominated)
 1998 Genie Award for Best Supporting Actor: Pale Saints (nominated)
 2008 Gemini Award for Best Performance by an Actor in a Featured Supporting Role in a Dramatic Program: The Trojan Horse (nominated)Broadcast Film Critics Association 2001 Alan J. Pakula Award for Artistic Excellence: The Contender (won)FilmOut LGBT Film Festival 2010 Audience Award for Best Supporting Actor: Oy Vey! My Son Is Gay!! (nominated)Sundance Film Festival'''

 1998 Grand Jury Prize: Jerry and Tom'' (nominated)

References

External links 
Toronto Star biography of Saul Rubinek

 

1948 births
Living people
Canadian Ashkenazi Jews
Canadian people of Jewish descent
People from Wolfratshausen
Jewish Canadian male actors
Canadian male film actors
Canadian male television actors
Canadian male voice actors
Best Supporting Actor Genie and Canadian Screen Award winners
Canadian people of Polish-Jewish descent
Polish Ashkenazi Jews
20th-century Canadian male actors
21st-century Canadian male actors
21st-century Canadian dramatists and playwrights
Canadian male dramatists and playwrights
21st-century Canadian male writers